Lectionary 145, designated by sigla ℓ 145 (in the Gregory-Aland numbering), is a Greek manuscript of the New Testament, on parchment leaves. Paleographically it had been assigned to the 12th century.

Description 

The codex contains Lessons from Gospels and Acts of the Apostles lectionary (Apostolos), on 187 parchment leaves (33.2 cm by 25.7 cm), with lacunae at the beginning and end.
The text is written in Greek minuscule letters, in two columns per page, 28 lines per page.

History 

The manuscript was examined by Martin and Gregory.

The manuscript is not cited in the critical editions of the Greek New Testament (UBS3).

Currently the codex is located in the National Library of France (Gr. 306), at Paris.

See also 

 List of New Testament lectionaries
 Biblical manuscript
 Textual criticism

Notes and references 

Greek New Testament lectionaries
12th-century biblical manuscripts
Bibliothèque nationale de France collections